José Brachi (26 December 1892 – 22 August 1967) was a Uruguayan footballer who played for Nacional.

Career statistics

International

International goals
Scores and results list Uruguay's goal tally first.

References

1892 births
1967 deaths
Uruguayan footballers
Uruguay international footballers
Association football forwards
Club Nacional de Football players
Uruguayan Primera División players